Cheng Lim LRT station is an elevated Light Rail Transit (LRT) station on the Sengkang LRT line West Loop in Anchorvale, Sengkang, Singapore, located at Anchorvale Street between the junctions of Anchorvale Crescent and Sengkang East Road. It was initially not opened for passenger service since the beginning of operations of West Loop on 29 January 2005 due to little development in the area. The station was thus opened on 1 January 2013. The station is built next to Sengkang Community Hospital, which opened on 28 August 2018. The hospital is connected to the station via a linkway.

Etymology
The station is located near the now defunct road Lorong Cheng Lim, around which used to have many farms in the area. The road, in turn, was named after Goh Cheng Lim, founding director of Kim Hock Hoe Ltd, ship owners and commission agents.

Gallery

References

External links

Railway stations in Singapore opened in 2013
Light Rail Transit (Singapore) stations
LRT stations in Sengkang
Anchorvale